Alexey Sorokin may refer to:

 Aleksei Sorokin (politician) (1888–1933), Estonian politician
 Alexey Sorokin (admiral) (1922–2020), Soviet Admiral
 Alexey Sorokin (fashion designer) (born 1983), Russian fashion designer
 Aleksey Sorokin (officer) (1931–1976), member of the Soviet cosmonaut program
 Alexey Sorokin (football administrator) (born 1972), Russian football administrator
 Alexey Sorokin (powerlifter), Russian powerlifter